Sebő Kiss (born 20 September 1983) is a Hungarian former professional tennis player.

A left-handed player, Kiss competed mostly in ITF Futures tournaments and won seven titles, two in singles and five in doubles. He had a career high singles ranking of 531 in the world.

Kiss represented the Hungary Davis Cup team from 2003 to 2011, appearing in 16 ties. His Davis Cup career included a win over former top-50 player Irakli Labadze in 2006. In his final tie, against Great Britain in 2011, he came up against Andy Murray. By this stage he was a full-time law student and no longer featured in professional tournaments.

ITF Futures titles

Singles: (2)

Doubles: (5)

See also
List of Hungary Davis Cup team representatives

References

External links
 
 
 

1983 births
Living people
Hungarian male tennis players
20th-century Hungarian people
21st-century Hungarian people